The Maryland–Estonia National Guard Partnership is one of 25 European partnerships that make-up the U.S. European Command State Partnership Program and one of 88 worldwide partnerships that make-up the National Guard State Partnership Program. The partnership serves as a success model to other nations.

History

EU and NATO accession in 2004 / Eurozone in Jan 2011
The Estonian economy has recovered to pre-crisis levels and is reporting approximately 1.9% growth.
Major concerns: energy security, cyber defense, emigration "brain drain" and initial defense.
NATO is the cornerstone of Estonia's National Security. Their defense model focuses on Initial Defense and NATO led Expeditionary Operations.
Estonia cooperates extensively with Latvia and Lithuania on joint military exercises. However, Estonia views itself primarily as a Nordic country, not Baltic and has close cultural and governmental ties with those countries.

Partnership focus
The current focus of the Maryland-Estonia Partnership is purely military-to-military based and includes ISAF Operational Support, Cyber Defense, Special Operations Forces (SOF) development, EST Air Force development, and the development of a Veteran Care/Warrior Warrior Program. To this end, Estonia hopes to improve training and force protection in support of ISAF and export expertise in cyber defense, explosive ordnance disposal, and E-governance to other NATO/EU nations. Additionally, Estonia seeks opportunities to increase their support of international operations, co-deployments with MD and enhanced regional M2M/Security Cooperation efforts.

See also
 Maryland Estonia Exchange Council

References

External links

The EUCOM State Partnership page for Maryland-Estonia
Department of Defense News on the Maryland-Estonia Partnership
EUCOM SPP
National Guard Bureau SPP
National Guard Bureau SPP News Archives

Estonia–United States military relations
Maryland National Guard
Military alliances involving the United States